= Degulhalli =

- Village
- Location in Karnataka, India Degulhalli (India)
- Coordinates: 15°34′45.2″N 74°44′17.2″E
- Country: India
- State: Karnataka
- District: Belgaum

Languages
  - Official: Kannada
- Time zone: UTC+5:30 (IST)

Degulhalli is a village in Belgaum district in the southern state of Karnataka, India.
